Gij (also Romanized as Gīj) is a village in Hasanabad Rural District, in the Central District of Ravansar County, Kermanshah Province, Iran. At the 2010 census, its population was 97, in 20 families.

References 

Populated places in Ravansar County